Henry Brett may refer to:

Henry Brett (MP for Gloucester) (–1674), English Royalist politician
Henry Brett (colonel) (died 1724), English army officer and Tory politician
Henry Brett (journalist) (1843–1927), New Zealand journalist, newspaper proprietor, publisher, writer, politician
Henry Brett (polo player) (born 1974), English polo player
Henry Brett (priest) (1868–1932), Dean of Belfast